Arthur Thomas (January 30, 1924 – March 20, 2003), better known as Sailor Art Thomas or Seaman Art Thomas, was an American Merchant Mariner, bodybuilder, and professional wrestler.

A former WWA World Heavyweight Champion, Thomas was posthumously inducted into the WWE Hall of Fame in 2016.

Early life 
Thomas was born in Gurdon, Arkansas, as the son of Alfred and Jessie (Lunon) Thomas. In 1935, he moved to Madison, Wisconsin.  After his mother's death he was raised in a Wisconsin orphanage and in foster homes.

Military career 
Thomas spent 27 months in the United States Merchant Marine. Serving in a construction battalion, Thomas helped build an airstrip in Guam.

Professional wrestling career 
After leaving the Merchant Marine, Thomas worked for Greyhound Lines before becoming a professional bodybuilder. After joining a bodybuilding troupe, he began touring the United States. After being spotted by promoter Jimmy Demetral, Thomas trained as a professional wrestler. He made his debut in 1943. Thomas would usually be introduced as a "just discharged" Navy seaman, wearing a regulation "crackerjack" uniform and pea coat, and enter the ring as a plant to oppose the villain's dishonorable tactics.

Throughout the early 1960s, Thomas won a series of tag team championships around North America: the Worldwide Wrestling Associates International Television Tag Team Championship with Lou Thesz in California, the Maple Leaf Wrestling NWA International Tag Team Championship with John Paul Henning in Toronto, and the NWA Detroit World Tag Team Championship with Bobo Brazil in Detroit. In 1962 and 1963, Thomas won the NWA Texas Heavyweight Championship in the Texas-based Southwest Sports promotion on two occasions. Thomas also competed for the World Wide Wrestling Federation from 1963 to 1964, teaming with Bobo Brazil and Bruno Sammartino.

In April 1972, Thomas won the WWA World Heavyweight Championship of the Indianapolis-based World Wrestling Association, defeating Baron von Raschke. The title was held up the next month after a bout between Thomas and von Raschke.

Thomas retired in 1981.

Personal life 
Thomas had seven children. He died of cancer only a month after being diagnosed with it.

Championships and accomplishments 
 Big Time Wrestling
 NWA World Tag Team Championship (Detroit version) (1 time) – with Bobo Brazil
 Maple Leaf Wrestling
 NWA International Tag Team Championship (Toronto version) (3 times) – with John Paul Henning
 Southwest Sports
 NWA Texas Heavyweight Championship (2 times)
 World Wrestling Association
 WWA World Heavyweight Champion (1 time)
 Worldwide Wrestling Associates
 WWA International Television Tag Team Championship (1 time) – with Lou Thesz
 WWE
 WWE Hall of Fame (Class of 2016)

References

External links 
 
 
 

1924 births
2003 deaths
African-American male professional wrestlers
American bodybuilders
American male professional wrestlers
Deaths from cancer in the United States
People from Clark County, Arkansas
Professional wrestlers from Arkansas
Professional wrestlers from Wisconsin
United States Merchant Mariners
WWE Hall of Fame Legacy inductees
Stampede Wrestling alumni
20th-century African-American sportspeople
21st-century African-American people
Place of death missing
20th-century professional wrestlers